Queens Walk is a tram stop on the Nottingham Express Transit (NET) network, previously known as Meadows Centre. The stop is situated on Queens Walk in the Meadows area of the city of Nottingham. It is situated on reserved track and comprises a pair of side platforms flanking the tracks. The stop is on line 2 of the NET, from Phoenix Park via the city centre to Clifton, and trams run at frequencies that vary between 4 and 8 trams per hour, depending on the day and time of day.

Queens Walk opened on 25 August 2015, along with the rest of NET's phase two.

In the original plans for NET phase two, the stop now known as Meadows Embankment was to be called Queens Walk. However, by popular demand this name was transferred to the stop previously known as Meadows Centre.

Gallery

References

External links

Nottingham Express Transit stops
Railway stations in Great Britain opened in 2015